Miconia lugonis is a species of plant in the family Melastomataceae. It is endemic to Ecuador.  Its natural habitat is subtropical or tropical moist lowland forests.

References

Endemic flora of Ecuador
lugonis
Near threatened plants
Taxonomy articles created by Polbot